Sam's Choice is a private label brand created by Cott Beverages for Walmart stores. The brand was introduced as "Sam's American Choice" in 1991 and has since been shortened to simply "Sam's Choice". It is named after Sam Walton, the founder of Walmart. Items produced under the Sam's Choice label primarily are grocery items.

Brand portfolio

Beverages

Soft drinks
All varieties are available in 2-liter bottles.
Some varieties are available in 12oz cans, 8oz cans, 12oz bottles, 16.9oz bottles and 20oz bottles. Many Walmarts have Sam's Cola branded vending machines in their vestibules or entranceways.
 Cola (in various varieties, including diet, cherry, and diet caffeine free)
 Twist-Up (lemon-lime)
 Mountain Lightning (formerly Green Lightning; citrus flavored; also available in orange and grape)
 Dr. Thunder (formerly Southern Lightning; also available in diet; "pepper" type)
 Root Beer
 Grapette
 Orangette
 Ginger ale
 Lemonade
 Pineapple
 Fruit punch
 Raspberry
 Grapefruit
 Cream soda
 Red Tornado (red cream soda)

Kid's Choice 8oz. bottles
 Bubble Gum (blue-colored)
 Orange
 Fruit Punch
 Grape
 Lemonade
 Water

Other beverages
 Bottled water
 Clear American carbonated and flavored water
 Tea
 Coffee

Other products
 Ice Cream (regular & premium)
 Chocolate
 Pizza (regular & thin crust, e.g. buffalo chicken)
 Plastic wrap
 Salsa

References

See also

 List of Walmart brands

American soft drinks
Walmart brands